Sara Gallardo Drago Mitre (23 December 1931 – 14 June 1988) was an influential Argentine author and journalist.

Life
Gallardo was born in Buenos Aires to an upper class family with extensive agricultural property. She became an astute observer and critic of the Argentine aristocracy. She was Bartolomé Mitre's great-great-granddaughter.

She was married twice, first to Luis Pico Estrada and then to H. A. Murena. Gallardo began publishing in 1958. In addition to her numerous newspaper columns and essays, she published five novels, a collection of short stories, several children’s books, and a number of travelogues. She contributed to the magazines Primera Plana,  Panorama and Confirmado among others. She is quoted as often saying, "Writing is an absurd and heroic activity."

Greatly affected by the death of her second husband in 1975, she moved with her children to La Cumbre, Córdoba Province, to a house provided by the writer Manuel Mujica Láinez. Then in 1979, she moved to Barcelona, where she wrote La Rosa en el Viento (The Rose in the Wind), her last book. She continued her travels in Switzerland and Italy, but she did not finish any more works. Upon her return to Argentina she died at age 56 of an asthma attack in Buenos Aires. She left behind notes for a planned biography of the Jewish intellectual and Carmelite nun, Edith Stein, who was killed at the Auschwitz concentration camp in 1942.

Works
Enero ("January ")(1958) is her first novel. It details the intensely private world of an adolescent farmworker.  It is written in a deliberately ambiguous way to reflect the confusion of the main character, who becomes pregnant after being raped.

El País del Humo ("Land of Smoke")(1977) is a collection of short stories and literary sketches that show a fantastical side that was more associated with her children’s books.  Some of the stories can be described as science fiction.

Other works include the novels Pantalones azules (1963), Los galgos, los galgos (1968), Eisejuaz (1971) and La rosa del viento (1979).

Works in English translation 
 Land of Smoke (trans. Jessica Sequeira). Pushkin Press, 2018.

References

Further reading
 Flores, Angel (1992) "Sara Gallardo" Spanish American Authors: The Twentieth Century H. W. Wilson Company, New York, pp. 333–335, 
 Marting, Diane E. (Ed.) (1990) "Gallardo, Sara (1931-1988)" Spanish American Women Writers: A bio-bibliographical source book"  Greenwood Press, New York, 
 Pollastri,  Laura (1980) Fantasía y realismo mágico en dos cuentos de El País del humo, de Sara Gallardo'' Dirección General de Cultura, Departamento de Literatura Argentina, Tucumán OCLC 65651831  - a seven-page paper presented at the Congreso Nacional de Literatura Argentina, held in Horco Molle, Aug. 14-17, 1980, in Spanish.

External links

 "Narrativa Breve Completa de Sara Gallardo" La Basica Online ("Short Narrative on the Complete Works of Sara Gallardo") in Spanish
 "Sara Gallardo" El Broli Argentino  in Spanish
  Brizuela, Leopoldo (27 September 2005) "Sara Gallardo en el país del humo" La Nación in Spanish

1931 births
1988 deaths
Argentine women short story writers
Argentine science fiction writers
Argentine non-fiction writers
Argentine people of Greek descent
Argentine women journalists
20th-century Argentine women writers
20th-century Argentine writers
Argentine essayists
Argentine women novelists
Magic realism writers
Women science fiction and fantasy writers
20th-century Argentine novelists
Argentine women essayists
Writers from Buenos Aires
20th-century short story writers
20th-century essayists